"Wish You Were Here" is a song written by Kye Fleming and Dennis Morgan, and recorded by American country music artist Barbara Mandrell.  It was released in August 1981 as the second and final single from her live album Barbara Mandrell Live.  It peaked at number 2 on the U.S. Billboard Hot Country Singles chart and number 11 on the Canadian RPM Country Tracks chart.

Chart performance

References

1981 singles
Barbara Mandrell songs
Songs written by Kye Fleming
Songs written by Dennis Morgan (songwriter)
Song recordings produced by Tom Collins (record producer)
MCA Records singles
1981 songs